Thermanaeromonas toyohensis is a species of bacteria within the family Thermoanaerobacteraceae. This species is thermophilic, anaerobic, and can reduce thiosulfate. It was originally isolated from a geothermal aquifer more than 500 m below the surface of the Earth.

References

External links
StrainInfo: Thermanaeromonas toyohensis
Type strain of Thermanaeromonas toyohensis at BacDive -  the Bacterial Diversity Metadatabase

Thermoanaerobacterales
Thermophiles
Anaerobes
Bacteria described in 2002